James Brian Mark Purefoy (born 3 June 1964) is an English actor. He played Mark Antony in the HBO series Rome, Nick Jenkins in A Dance to the Music of Time, college professor turned serial killer Joe Carroll in the series The Following, Solomon Kane in the film of the same name, and Hap Collins in the Sundance series Hap and Leonard. In 2018, he starred as Laurens Bancroft in Altered Carbon, a Netflix original series. Following an uncredited role as V in the 2006 film V for Vendetta (replaced and dubbed over by Hugo Weaving), he was cast as Captain Gulliver "Gully" Troy / Captain Blighty in the 2020–2021 second and 2022 third season of the Gotham prequel television series, Pennyworth, in a main role.

He was born in Somerset and attended Sherborne School before training at the Central School of Speech and Drama.

Early life
Purefoy was born in Taunton, Somerset, the eldest son of Anthony Chetwynd Purefoy and Shirley, née Taylor. The Purefoy family were landed gentry, of Shalstone, Buckinghamshire; the family name passed in the female line through Anthony Chetwynd Purefoy's mother, Mary Lilias Geraldine, daughter of Admiral Richard Purefoy (who had changed his surname from Fitzgerald as his mother was the heir and niece of the politician George Purefoy-Jervoise, head of the family); she married Rev. Brian Mews, vicar of Tewkesbury, who changed his name to Purefoy.

Purefoy boarded at Sherborne School, which he left with only one O-level. He later went to night school and received 11 more O-levels, before taking his A-levels at Brooklands College in Weybridge. He worked as a porter at Yeovil District Hospital before studying acting at the Central School of Speech and Drama.

Career

Stage work
Purefoy's early professional roles included Romeo in Romeo and Juliet in Leatherhead, Walter in Mary Morgan at the Riverside Studios and Alan Strang in Equus on tour. He subsequently joined the Royal Shakespeare Company (RSC) in 1988 and appeared in The Constant Couple, Macbeth, The Tempest, The Man Who Came to Dinner (Gene Saks, Barbican) and King Lear as Edgar.

Elsewhere, he has also appeared as Laertes in Hamlet at the Bristol Old Vic (1991), Brian in William Gaminara's Back Up the Hearse and Let them Sniff the Flowers at the Hampstead Theatre (1992), Roland Maule in Noël Coward's Present Laughter at the Globe Theatre (1993), Biff in Death of a Salesman, alongside Ken Stott and Jude Law, at the West Yorkshire Playhouse in Leeds (1994), Tony in The Servant at the Birmingham Rep (1995). He returned to the RSC for Simon Callow's stage adaptation of the film classic, Les enfants du paradis at the Barbican. He also played Hugh de Morville in Paul Corcoran's Four Nights in Knaresborough at the Tricycle Theatre, (1999) and Loveless in Trevor Nunn's production of The Relapse at the National Theatre in 2001.

Between March and June 2011 he starred as Peter in Trevor Nunn's production of Flare Path at the Theatre Royal, Haymarket, alongside Sheridan Smith and Sienna Miller, as part of the playwright Terence Rattigan's centenary year celebrations.

He appeared as part of the ensemble cast of the 2019 West and Middle Chinnock Christmas Show, as well as singing several sea shanties from Fisherman's Friends.

Film and television

In 1991, Purefoy played James McCarthy, a young man accused of murdering his father, in "The Boscombe Valley Mystery," in Granada's The Case-Book of Sherlock Holmes. One of his notable roles was as Nicholas Jenkins in the four-part miniseries A Dance to the Music of Time for Channel 4 in 1997. He played Edward, the Black Prince in the film A Knight's Tale, Rawdon Crawley in Vanity Fair with Reese Witherspoon and Tom Bertram in the 1999 production of Mansfield Park. He has played major roles in several television costume dramas, including Sharpe's Sword, The Tenant of Wildfell Hall, The Prince and the Pauper, The Mayor of Casterbridge, Blackbeard: Terror at Sea, Beau Brummell: This Charming Man, The Tide of Life, Camelot and Rome.

Purefoy was screen tested for the role of James Bond in 1995 for GoldenEye, but ultimately lost the role to Pierce Brosnan. Throughout 2004 and 2005 Purefoy's name was rumoured as a possible candidate to replace Brosnan as Bond in future films. Speculation suggested that his departure was due to an opportunity to play James Bond in the 2006 film Casino Royale. He was originally the actor for V in the 2006 film V for Vendetta but had creative differences with the production team and left the film six weeks into filming. Parts of the film contain (dubbed) scenes of Purefoy.

Purefoy played Mark Antony in the HBO/BBC original television series, Rome. At the time there were rumours that at least one nude body in the show had been digitally enhanced. When his Wikipedia entry, which at that time referred to the rumours, was brought up in an interview with Alastair McKay, published in the January 2007 issue of Out magazine, Purefoy said, "I won't say whose it was, but there was a penis in the series that may have been slightly enhanced. But it wasn't mine. Mine's all mine."

Producer William J. MacDonald announced that James Purefoy would play Simon Templar in a new TV series of The Saint. The new series was scheduled to start shooting in Berlin and Australia in April 2008. However, production ultimately did not occur and in August Purefoy was reported as negotiating with NBC to star in another series, The Philanthropist. He starred as Teddy Rist in the summer television series, which aired on NBC beginning in June 2009. His character is a billionaire playboy who decides to use his wealth and power to help others in need.

In 2009 Purefoy played the titular character in an adaptation of Robert E. Howard's Solomon Kane. In 2013, The Following debuted, starring Purefoy as the lead antagonist of the series. He portrays Joe Carroll, a former professor who becomes a serial killer and leads a cult of followers, all of whom help create Carroll's "story".

It was announced in June 2014 that Purefoy would join the cast of the film High-Rise with Tom Hiddleston and Jeremy Irons. Later in 2014, Purefoy co-starred in the Formula 1-themed music video for David Guetta's song "Dangerous".

From 2016 to 2018 Purefoy starred as Hap Collins in Sundance's adaptation of Hap and Leonard, alongside Michael Kenneth Williams. In 2018 he starred as Laurens Bancroft in Altered Carbon, a Netflix original series. In February 2019, Hybrid (who provided the score to Interlude in Prague) released a short film to accompany their single "Hold Your Breath" from the album Light of the Fearless. The film starred Purefoy as the brooding "Mr Black".

In 2020, Purefoy joined the cast of the second season of the V for Vendetta and Gotham prequel television series Pennyworth in a main role, portraying Captain Gulliver "Gully" Troy, a former SAS captain and the leader of a crew of criminals consisting of former soldiers, who later becomes the enhanced super-soldier Captain Blighty in the 2022 third season.

Personal life

Purefoy has a son, Joseph (born 1997), with the actress Holly Aird. He also has a daughter, Rose (born 2012) and another two sons, Ned and Kit, (born 2017) with documentary director and producer Jessica Adams. He married Adams in Somerset in July 2014.

Purefoy is a supporter of both Yeovil Town and Manchester United.

Filmography

Film

Television

Radio

References

External links

James Purefoy as Blackbeard
James Purefoy as Beau Brummell
Interview with James Purefoy, BBC Somerset, September 2005
Interview with James Purefoy, BBC Somerset, January 2006
Interview with James Purefoy, BBC Somerset, February 2007
Interview in The Guardian, 6 January 2007
Men's Vogue profile
Hold your breath short film

Living people
1964 births
20th-century English male actors
21st-century English male actors
Alumni of the Royal Central School of Speech and Drama
English male film actors
English male Shakespearean actors
English male stage actors
English male radio actors
English male television actors
Male actors from Somerset
People educated at Sherborne School
People from Taunton
Royal Shakespeare Company members